Hampton railway station is located on the Sandringham line in Victoria, Australia. It serves the south-eastern Melbourne suburb of Hampton, and it opened on 2 September 1887. It was renamed Retreat on 1 October 1887, and was renamed back to Hampton on 10 September 1889.

History

Hampton station opened on 2 September 1887, when the railway line from Brighton Beach was extended to Sandringham. Like the suburb itself, the station was named after Dyas Hampton, an early local market gardener. Developers at the time also like the regal sounding name, which was akin to neighbouring suburb Sandringham.

In 1966, boom barriers replaced interlocked gates at the Hampton Street level crossing, located at the south (Down) end of the station. The signal box which protected the level crossing was also abolished during this time. On 16 January 1968, a collision involving two Tait train sets occurred between Hampton and Sandringham.

In 1975, the present station buildings were provided.

On 30 August 2002, Comeng motor carriage 500M was destroyed by fire as it travelled between Hampton and Sandringham.

In November 2016, a proposed development near the station generated controversy, as it was seen as "bringing a white cruise ship" to Hampton.

Platforms and services

Hampton has two side platforms. It is serviced by Metro Trains' Sandringham line services.

On rare occasions, extra services for major events may originate at Hampton instead of Sandringham. These services are formed by empty trains directly from the stabling yard at Sandringham.

Platform 1:
  all stations services to Flinders Street

Platform 2:
  all stations services to Sandringham

Transport links

Kinetic Melbourne operates one route via Hampton station, under contract to Public Transport Victoria:
 : Westfield Southland – St Kilda station

Ventura Bus Lines operates two routes to and from Hampton station, under contract to Public Transport Victoria:
 : to Carrum station
 : to Berwick station

References

External links
 Melway map at street-directory.com.au

Railway stations in Melbourne
Railway stations in Australia opened in 1887
Railway stations in the City of Bayside